The 1902 Washington University football team represented the Washington University in St. Louis as an independent during the 1902 college football season. Led by  Hugh Whit in his first and only season as head coach, Washington University compiled a record of 2–6–1 and was outscored by opponents 210 to 84. White was hired as Washington University's coach in June 1902. He had played college football for four seasons at the University of Michigan and was captain of the 1901 Michigan Wolverines football team coached by Fielding H. Yost.

Schedule

References

Washington University
Washington University Bears football seasons
Washington University football